Davyd Khorava (born 29 June 1988) is a Ukrainian Paralympic judoka. He represented Ukraine at the 2012 Summer Paralympics and at the 2016 Summer Paralympics and he won two medals: the gold medal in the men's 66 kg event in 2012 and the bronze medal in the men's 66 kg event in 2016.

He won the silver medal in the men's 66 kg event at the 2015 IBSA European Judo Championships held in Odivelas, Portugal.

References

External links 
 

1988 births
Living people
Ukrainian male judoka
Paralympic judoka of Ukraine
Paralympic gold medalists for Ukraine
Paralympic bronze medalists for Ukraine
Paralympic medalists in judo
Judoka at the 2012 Summer Paralympics
Judoka at the 2016 Summer Paralympics
Medalists at the 2012 Summer Paralympics
Medalists at the 2016 Summer Paralympics
Place of birth missing (living people)
21st-century Ukrainian people